Mineral Bluff Depot is a historic train depot of the Marietta and North Georgia Railroad that was built in 1887, in Mineral Bluff, Georgia.  It is located at 150 Railroad Avenue.It was added to the National Register of Historic Places on March 1, 2007.

It had passenger service until 1949 and freight service until the late 1950s.

See also

Blue Ridge Depot
National Register of Historic Places listings in Fannin County, Georgia

References

External links
https://tsmri.org/

Railway stations on the National Register of Historic Places in Georgia (U.S. state)
National Register of Historic Places in Fannin County, Georgia
Railway stations in the United States opened in 1887
Railway stations closed in 1949
Transportation in Fannin County, Georgia
Former Louisville and Nashville Railroad stations